Aysia Polk (born August 10, 1990) is a former American child actress active from 1997 until 2005.

Background 
Polk had a recurring role on American Dreams playing Angela Walker from 2002–2005, and on Six Feet Under playing Taylor from 2002–2003.

She appeared in the movie Biker Boyz and had guest-starring roles on shows such as Moesha, The Hughleys and The Parkers.

She has also appeared in JAG, ER and Touched by an Angel.

External links 

1990 births
American child actresses
Living people
21st-century American women